Nina Leonidovna Petrova (born 28 November 1955) is a retired Russian swimmer. In 1972, she set a European record in the 200 m medley and finished eights in the 400 m medley at the 1972 Summer Olympics. Between 1970 and 1972 she set five national records in these disciplines.

She is married to Vladimir Baranov; they both work as swimming coaches for children.

Publications

References

1955 births
Living people
Russian female swimmers
Russian female medley swimmers
Olympic swimmers of the Soviet Union
Swimmers at the 1972 Summer Olympics
Soviet female swimmers